Robert Lüthi (born 12 July 1958, in Biel/Bienne) is a retired Swiss footballer who played as a centre forward.

Honours
Neuchâtel Xamax
Swiss Super League: 1986–87, 1987–88
Swiss Super Cup: 1987, 1988

References

External links

1958 births
Living people
Swiss men's footballers
Association football forwards
FC Biel-Bienne players
Switzerland international footballers
People from Biel/Bienne
Sportspeople from the canton of Bern